Kirkcaldy is a town in Fife, Scotland.
Kirkcaldy may also refer to:
Kirkcaldy, Alberta, a hamlet in Alberta, Canada
Vulcan/Kirkcaldy Aerodrome, an aerodrome in Alberta, Canada

Entities associated with the town in Fife
Kirkcaldy (UK Parliament constituency), constituency which existed 1974-2005
Kirkcaldy (Scottish Parliament constituency)
Kirkcaldy railway station, railway station  
Kirkcaldy RFC, rugby union club established 1873
Kirkcaldy United F.C., association football club established 1901
Kirkcaldy YM F.C., association football club established 1969

Geographical features
 Kirkcaldy railway station, Adelaide, a former railway station on the Henley Beach railway line

People with name Kirkcaldy
James Kirkcaldy of Grange (died 1556), a Fife laird and treasurer of Scotland
William Kirkcaldy of Grange (1520–1573), a Scottish politician and soldier, son of James
Henry Dalziel, 1st Baron Dalziel of Kirkcaldy (1868–1935), only holder of the title
George Willis Kirkaldy, zoologist

See also

Kirkaldy Spur, landform in East Antarctica
Kirkaldy (surname), easily confused spelling